D'Ro'd Wullmaus was a newspaper published in Luxembourg between 1970 and 1973.

References

1970 establishments in Luxembourg
1973 disestablishments in Luxembourg
Defunct newspapers published in Luxembourg
Luxembourgish-language newspapers